KHTV-CD, virtual channel 6 (UHF digital channel 22), is a low-power, Class A MeTV+ owned-and-operated television station licensed to Los Angeles, California, United States. The station is owned by Chicago-based Weigel Broadcasting. KHTV-CD's transmitter is located at the Mount Harvard Radio Site in the San Gabriel Mountains.

Due to its low-power status, KHTV-CD's broadcasting radius does not reach all of Greater Los Angeles. Therefore, it must rely on cable and satellite carriage to reach the entire market.

History
The station was founded on October 22, 1993. It signed on as K38EA on channel 38, before moving to channel 48 as KHTV-LP, starting in 2000 as an affiliate of now defunct Home Shopping en Español, later rebranding to HSE (a Spanish-language channel operated by parent channel Home Shopping Network) until HSE ceased operations in June 2002. When KOCE launched its digital signal on channel 48 in 2001, this displaced KHTV-LP to channel 67. It stayed on channel 67 until December 31, 2011, when the last of the LPTV stations still using out-of-core channels 52-69 had to vacate that spectrum. In 2012, KHTV-LP converted to digital as KHTV-LD and moved to channel 27. On July 11, 2012, the station received class A status and changed its call sign to KHTV-CD. In 2019, as part of the repack, KHTV-CD moved to its current channel 22 allocation, channel sharing with MeTV owned-and-operated station KAZA-TV.
 
The KHTV call letters were originally used by an unrelated full-power station in Portland, Oregon on channel 27, and in Houston, Texas on channel 39.

On February 28, 2022, KHTV-CD discontinued carrying Jewelry Television on 6.1 and replaced it with MeTV Plus. With this change, 6.1 was converted to 720p HD. All remaining subchannels carried by KHTV-CD were removed. MeTV Plus had been on KAZA 54.3 since its expansion to Weigel-owned stations in September 2021.

Subchannels

The station's digital signal is multiplexed:

References

External links

HTV-CD
Television channels and stations established in 1993
Low-power television stations in the United States
Weigel Broadcasting